General Hope may refer to:

Alexander Hope (British Army officer) (1769–1837), British Army general
Charles Hope (British Army officer) (1768–1828), British Army general
James Archibald Hope (1786–1871), British Army general
John Hope (British Army officer, born 1765) (1765–1836), British Army lieutenant general
John Bruce Hope (c. 1684–1766), British Army lieutenant general
John Hope, 4th Earl of Hopetoun (1765–1823), British Army general
Sir William Hope, 14th Baronet (1819–1898), British Army general